The Leinster Minor Club Football Championship is a club competition between the top minor Gaelic football teams in Leinster. The 2006 champions of Leinster are Cuala of Dublin, who defeated Erins Own of Carlow by a scoreline of 3-8 to 1-7. The 2007 final was contested by St Brigids of Dublin and Donaghmore-Ashbourne of Meath, which St. Brigids won. The 2008 final was won by Donaghmore-Ashbourne, who beat St. Geraldine's of Louth.The 2014 final was won by Ferbane/Belmont of Offaly, who beat Newtown Blues of Louth. 
The 2015 final saw reigning champions Ferbane/Belmont of Offaly take on Ballymun Kickhams of Dublin. The sides were level on 1-12 a piece after full-time and were level again at 1-13 to 1-13 after extra time. Ballymun Kickhams won the game 4-2 on penalties.

Roll of honour

See also
 Leinster Senior Club Football Championship

References

Leinster GAA club football competitions